Our Lady of Victory Academy is located on 801 Shaw Street in Fort Worth, Texas.  Ground for the school was broken on March 25, 1909.  The cornerstone was laid later that year.  The Fort Worth architectural firm Sanguinet and Staats designed the building.  The five-story building was constructed at a cost of $200.000.  The building welcomed 31 boarders and 41 day pupils on September 12, 1910.  The school offered classes on elocution, grammar, business, art and music.

See also

National Register of Historic Places listings in Tarrant County, Texas

References

External links

Architecture in Fort Worth: Victory Arts Center

School buildings on the National Register of Historic Places in Texas
National Register of Historic Places in Fort Worth, Texas
Churches completed in 1910
Houses in Tarrant County, Texas